Jean Paul Van Bendegem (born 28 March 1953 in Ghent) is a mathematician, a philosopher of science, and a professor at the Vrije Universiteit Brussel in Brussels.

Career

Van Bendegem received his master's degree in mathematics in 1976. Afterwards, he went to study philosophy. He attended lectures on the philosophy of mathematics from Leo Apostel. He received his master's degree in philosophy in 1979.

Van Bendegem wrote his PhD thesis in philosophy on the subject of finitism under the supervision of Diderik Batens while at Ghent University. He defended his thesis in 1983. The content of the thesis was on notation systems, number theory, analysis, physics and logic in a finite empirical framework.

Van Bendegem was the dean of the faculty of Arts and philosophy, and was until his retirement in September 2018 head of the CLPS (Centre for Logic and Philosophy of Science) at the same university.

He is an honorary chairman of SKEPP (Research Society for Critical Evaluation of Pseudoscience and the Paranormal), an organisation that is prepared to pay 10,000 euros to anyone who can prove the validity of a paranormal claim.

Van Bendegem is the university's representative to the CNRL–NCNL (French: Centre National de Recherches de Logique, Dutch: Nationaal Centrum voor Navorsingen in de Logica, English: National Centre for Investigations in Logic). He is chief editor of their quarterly magazine Logique et Analyse.

In mathematics, he is a strict finitist.

Bibliography

Books

References

External links
 Vrije Universiteit Brussel
 Homepage
 

1953 births
Living people
Philosophy academics
Scientists from Ghent
Flemish academics
Academic staff of Vrije Universiteit Brussel
Belgian skeptics
20th-century Belgian philosophers
21st-century Belgian philosophers